SMR may refer to:

Organisations

 Seattle Mountain Rescue, American non-profit
 Solomon Mahlangu Regiment of the South African Army
 Swedish Resistance Movement, a neo-Nazi political party

Places
 San Marino (by ISO 3166-1, IOC and FIFA country code)
 Rimba Secondary School, Brunei
 Simón Bolívar International Airport (Colombia) (by IATA code)
 Tell Kazel (Ancient Egyptian: Smr), archaeological site in Syria

Railways
 Snowdon Mountain Railway, Gwynedd, Wales
 South Maitland Railway, NSW, Australia
 Stapleford Miniature Railway, Melton Mowbray, England

Science and technology

Biology and medicine
 Sensorimotor rhythm, a brain wave rhythm
 Standardized mortality ratio, in epidemiology
 Suppressed mite reproduction, a trait in honey bees, see  varroa sensitive hygiene

Computing
 Shingled magnetic recording, a hard disk storage method 
 State machine replication in distributed computing
 Symbolic Music Representation in MPEG-4 Part 3

Other uses in science and technology
 Small modular reactor, a type of nuclear reactor
 Specialized Mobile Radio
 Square matricial representation of polynomials
 Steam methane reforming, for producing hydrogen
 Surface movement radar, used by airports
 Slope mass rating, of rock mass
 Spherically Mounted Retroreflector, a laser tracker target

Other uses
 Shintō Musō-ryū, Japanese martial art
 Sites and monuments record, of archaeological sites in the UK